Real World/Road Rules Challenge: The Island is the 16th season of the MTV reality game show, The Challenge (at the time known as Real World/Road Rules Challenge).

Like previous seasons of The Challenge, The Island featured cast members from various past seasons of The Real World and Road Rules, of which The Challenge was a spin-off, competing along with several cast members from the Fresh Meat challenge. This season featured the contestants "stranded" on an island off the coast of Panama, where the cast competed for a buried treasure chest filled with $300,000 USD in gold. Unlike in previous Challenges, the cast was not housed in a luxurious dwelling, but was "forced" to improvise and "work" for the basic necessities of food and shelter, as on the TV series Survivor. Unlike previous  seasons of The Challenge, there were no predetermined teams. Instead, the cast members had to forge their own alliances. Of the twenty cast members, there were only four winners. The Island premiered on September 10, 2008, and concluded on October 29, 2008.

Contestants

Format
The contestants are "stranded" on an island, the objective of the challenge is to construct two boats that they will eventually use to reach a nearby island where the buried treasure of $300,000 is actually hidden. Once the boats are complete, only eight key-holders will be allowed to board and compete in a 4-on-4 race to get to the buried treasure.

At the beginning of each episode, materials to build the boats, food, information about the boats and some luxury are air-dropped, it's up to the contestants to decide how the food will be divided and to assemble the pieces and make sure their vessels are seaworthy.

They will then have to choose 3 contestants to go into a face-off. In order to get one of the keys to be in the final race and have a shot for the money, contestants must risk it all in this three-way face-offs. After each face-off, the winner receives a key, the losers get a chance to speak in front of every contestant as should why they should stay in the island, the contestants (except for the winner of the face-off) vote on who should leave the island. In the case of a tie, the winner of the face-off will decide who leaves and who stays.

However, the rules of the challenge are given to the competitors as the challenge advances, and the way to get the keys can change at any moment. At the end of the season, the eight key-holders will have to divide themselves into two teams of four, build their boats and race to the island where the buried treasure of $300,000 is hidden.

Face-offs
Leaning Tower: Contestants must swim out to retrieve 12 pegs that will help them climb a telephone pole with a bell at the top. The first to the climb to the top and ring the bell wins.
Played by: Abram vs. Kenny vs. Tonya
Ring Wrestle: Contestants must all hold onto a ring and wrestle it out of the other's hands. The last person remaining wins.
Played by: Abram vs. Derrick vs. Johnny
The Rack: Contestants must sit on two parallel bars situated over water and never lose contact with both bars. The last person remaining wins.
Played by: KellyAnne vs. Rachel vs. Robin
Ball Buster: Contestants get to pick a partner and they all must fight to push a  ball into their goal twice. The first person to do so wins.
Played by: Ashli vs. Jenn vs. Paula
Bridge It: Contestants must walk back and forth across a bridge. After every time they walk across, they must remove one of the planks, making it more difficult for the next person to walk across. The only person who does not fall from the bridge wins.
Played by: Dan vs. Evelyn vs. Tyrie
Rat in a Cage: Contestants are each be locked in their own cage and each has four locks. Four keys are scattered that they have to untie. The first out of the cage wins.
Played by: Johnny vs. Cohutta vs. Derrick
Timbur: Contestants must stand on a stump and hold two heavy tree trunks up with each arm. Whoever holds the two tree trunks the longest wins.
Played by: Johanna vs. Colie vs. Ryan
 Water Bound: Contestants are shackled at the ankles and dropped in a tank of water with a weight. They must continuously bounce up and sink back down with the weight. The person who holds the weight the longest wins.
Played by: Dan vs. Evelyn vs. KellyAnne vs. Johanna

Game summary

 Red Boat
 Blue Boat

Face-Off Progress

Competition
 The contestant won the competition
 The contestant made it to the end of the challenge, but lost in the final
 The contestant won the face-off and a key
 The contestant won the face-off and took the key of another contestant
 The contestant lost the face-off, but was not eliminated and received a key
 The contestant lost the face-off, but was not eliminated
 The contestant had their key stolen by the face-off winner
 The contestant had their key stolen by the face-off winner and was automatically eliminated
 The contestant lost the face-off and was automatically eliminated
 The contestant lost the face-off and was voted out
 The contestant quit the competition
 The contestant was given a key by an eliminated player

Voting Progress

Key holders

 Key Holder at the end of each Episode.

Episodes

Reunion special
The Island Reunion: The Final Face Off aired on November 5, 2008 and was hosted by Carlos Santos from MTV Tres. The cast members who attended were: Johanna, Paula, Kenny, Derrick, Johnny, Evelyn, Ryan, Jenn, KellyAnne and Robin. A promo from the upcoming The Real World: Brooklyn season is shown.

Controversy
The season sparked controversy for production's poor respect of the local environment. Panamanian locals criticised MTV for clearing a small patch of forest for construction, developing an access road through the forest and installing generators and lighting on the beach.

Notes

References

External links

Island
2008 American television seasons
Television shows filmed in Panama

ru:Алчные экстремалы: Остров